The Xiaomi Redmi Note 4 is the fourth smartphone under the Redmi Note series developed by Xiaomi Inc. It is a part of Xiaomi's budget Redmi smartphone lineup. It has two variants : The older version sold as Redmi Note 4 is powered by a Deca-core Mediatek MT6797 Helio X20 SOC. The upgraded version, sold both as Redmi Note 4X and Redmi Note 4 (where MTK version was not released) is powered by an Octa-core MSM8953 Qualcomm Snapdragon 625 SoC.  The Redmi Note 4 was succeeded by Redmi Note 5.

History 
In January 2017, the Snapdragon version of the Xiaomi Redmi Note 4 or Xiaomi Redmi Note 4X became the company's first major launch. It came with 2GB RAM + 32GB eMMC, 3GB RAM + 16 or 32GB eMMC and 4GB RAM + 64GB eMMC variants. The phone sports a 5.5-inch Full HD IPS display (1080 x 1920 resolution), translating to a pixel density of 401ppi. The display also promises to have contrast ratio of 1000:1 and 72% coverage of NTSC colour gamut.

On February the 14th 2017, alongside the Chinese release of the Redmi Note 4X, Xiaomi released a limited edition set of the phone featuring Hatsune Miku. The set contained a customized box, the phone, a power bank and a protective case.

In October 2017, Lei Jun announced that the sales of Redmi Note 4X exceeded 20 million units globally and its reputation was good.

The company announced that as many as 9,624,110 units of Redmi Note 4 were sold in India in 2017 and that it was one of their best-selling smartphones in the last quarter of 2017.

The device sold over 10 Million units in India alone.

Specifications

Hardware
Xiaomi Redmi Note 4 MTK (codename nikel) is equipped with MediaTek MT6796 Helio X20 CPU and Mali-T880 MP4 GPU. It runs MIUI 8, (updated to MIUI 9.6) based on Android 6.0 . 

The Global 4 or 4X variant (SD - codename mido) uses Qualcomm's Octa-core 2.0 GHz Snapdragon 625 CPU and Adreno 506 GPU.

All variants included an  1080p display, 2, 3 or 4 GB of RAM, 16, 32 or 64 GB eMMC 5.1 Flash storage, a 5MP front camera, non-removable 4100 mAh Li-Po battery and it supports Wi-Fi 802.11a/b/g/n/ac* (* = Wi-Fi 802.11 ac band is supported on MTK variant only) networks on both the 2.4 and 5 GHz bands. Phones also support hybrid SIM and Memory Card configuration in which the user can have either two SIM cards or a SIM card + microSDHC card at one time because one SIM card and the microSDHC card share the same physical tray slot.

Another notable feature of the phone is the presence of a fingerprint sensor at the back which can also be used for capturing images via the front or the rear cameras. The device also comes equipped with an RGB Notification LED light and is recognized as one of the last phones by Xiaomi to have an RGB light instead of the monochromatic White color notification LED used in devices launched thereafter.

The Redmi Note 4(MTK) has screws on each side of the micro-USB port which allows easy access to internal components. The Redmi Note 4X does not have this pair of screws.

Also, the Redmi Note 4 (MTK) has a full metal body whereas the Global and Snapdragon variants of the phone have an anodized aluminum body with plastic inserts at the top and bottom for better signal reception. The global variant also does not have the diamond cut finish found on the MediaTek variant of the phone.

Software
On launch, it ran MIUI 8 based on Android 6.0, which was updated to MIUI 10.2 based on Android 7.0 for Snapdragon devices. Purchasing a Redmi Note 4 Snapdragon variant now will be running MIUI 8 based on Android 6.0.1 instead of Android 6.0. The Global Snapdragon Edition of the device is slated to receive MIUI 11 update based on Android 7.0 in November 2019.

The MediaTek edition, however, runs on MIUI 10 based on Android 6.0.

The Sailfish OS was ported on a Qualcomm version of Note 4.

Variants comparison

Reception 
The smartphone received mostly positive feedback upon its launch because of its great battery life, good thermal performance, great price-to-performance ratio and a great day-to-day performance.

GSMArena states: "The Redmi Note 4(X)'s Snapdragon 625, which we consider to be the ultimate mid-range chipset for this generation, provides excellent performance with great power efficiency and thermal properties. The battery life of this phone is jaw-dropping, the MIUI experience is smooth, and the camera does well in all occasions. All these goodies come in a sturdy metal body, which adds to the already great value of the Redmi Note 4(X)." Also, in GSMArena's device review, the Snapdragon edition of the phone scored much better than the specified figures, getting a 1500:1 Contrast ratio, 484nits of maximum luminance and excellent colour accuracy for the class. 

According to AndroidAuthority: "The Redmi Note 4(X) is not perfect, but it is a well-rounded package that one wouldn’t hesitate to recommend to anyone looking for a budget or mid-range smartphone. Packed in a neat chassis, the smartphone performs great and is a compelling value-for-money smartphone."

Gadgets360 also rated the phone 8 on 10, appreciating the device for its battery efficiency, good performance for the class and good thermal efficiency.

AndroidCentral also considered Redmi Note 4(SD variant) to be one of the best smartphones one can buy in the mid-budget range even after 6 months of launch.

TechRadar called Redmi Note 4 to be an overall impressive device overall, though lacking the X factor, getting 4/5 ratings.

Initially, upon launch, it was not received as the true successor of the Redmi Note 3(Snapdragon Variant) mostly because of the use of the Snapdragon 625 as opposed to the Snapdragon 650 in Redmi Note 3 in terms of the RAW performance of the CPU and GPU. Though perceived initially as a theoretical downgrade by media, XDA Developers also considered the device an upgrade to Redmi Note 3, citing its overall sustained performance, on par day to day performance and better battery and thermal performance by a good margin. The new Snapdragon 625 was well received by users as well as reviewers after using the device for a while owing to the better fabrication process, battery life and thermal efficiency of the new chipset over the Snapdragon 650.

Gallery

References

External links 
 Mi Global Home

Phablets
Redmi smartphones
Mobile phones introduced in 2017
Discontinued smartphones
Mobile phones with infrared transmitter